Sarajevo International Culture Exchange (short:SICE) was an international art project annually taking place between 2003 and 2007 in Sarajevo (Bosnia and Herzegovina).
SICE was held under the patronage of the German and Japanese embassy in Sarajevo. It was one of the biggest international art events in Sarajevo after the Balkan War.

Common
SICE emerged from a planned cooperation between the Tokyo National University of Fine Arts and Music and the faculty of fine arts at the University of Sarajevo. The Japanese artist Sohei Iwata started the project in 2003 with the help of Sanna Miericke, Willem Besselink, Tino Mager, Damir Kulo, Elodie Evers and Masaru Iwai. A few dozen artists from all over the world were invited to deal with Sarajevo in situ. The place was chosen due to its special conditions after the Balkan War.
The participants initiated workshops, film screenings, discussions and exhibitions independently from existing museums and galleries.

Themes
2003 - The first years theme was "Field-Projects".
2004 - "The Sarajevo Living Room" revitalised a destroyed factory and turned it into an art gallery.
2005 - "Re_Cultivation" took place at Skenderija, Empty House, Barake.
2006 - "Transition Compound" took place at Tokyo, Berlin, Sarajevo.
2007 - "Mo Bar"took place at Stage of Modern Art Museum of Sarajevo.

Publications
Every year's project was documented in a catalogue.
2005 Tokyo/JAP, 'Social Arts (Japanese)' Practica published by Film Arts.
Iwata, Sohei; Tino Mager, Elodie Evers (Ed.), 2nd SICE Project: The Sarajevo Living Room Šaran, Sarajevo, 2004.

Exhibitions
Galerie Nord (Berlin): "SICE - Transition Compound Berlin" 05.05.06 -24.05.06
Asahi Art Square (Tokyo) 14.02.06 - 21.02.06

External links
SICE kunstaspekte.de (German)
Stitching Foundation

Bosnia and Herzegovina art
Culture in Sarajevo